Kara is a town in southern Bougainville in Papua New Guinea, north of Buin. Buin Airport, formerly known as Kara Airfield, is situated nearby.

References 

Populated places in the Autonomous Region of Bougainville